Friedrich Nicolaus Bruhns  or Brauns  (11 February 1637 in Lollfuß – 13 March 1718 in Hamburg) was a German composer and music director in Hamburg.<ref>Otto Adalbert Beneke Hamburgische Geschichten und Denkwürigkeiten 1856 Page 336 "Auch dieser war eine künstlerische Notabilität Hamburgs, Friedrich Nicolaus Brauns, seit 1687 (!snomeu5 minor, Schul- und Dom-Cantor, auch Director der Hamburger Instrumental-Musik, gestorben 1718. Wir lernen ihn hier als Virtuosen ..."</ref>

Bruhns was born in Lollfuß, Schleswig. In 1682 he succeeded Nicolaus Adam Strungk in charge of the Hamburger Ratsmusik, later also taking on the charge of St. Mary's Cathedral. He was in practice succeeded by Johann Mattheson in 1715, but still formally held the positions till his death in Hamburg in 1718.L'Orgue Association des amis de l'Orgue - 2001 - Numéros 253 à 260 - Page 58 "Mattheson.... En 1718, il prit la relève de Friedrich Nicolaus Brauns comme « Director musices in cathedrali Hamburgensis » et composa avant tout des oratorios, dont Der fur die Siïnde, der Welt gemarterte und sterbende Jésus pour le temps de la passion ..."

Handel joined the opera orchestra during Brauns' time.Laure Gauthier L'Opéra à Hambourg (1648-1728): Naissance d'un genre 2009 "Cette fois, c'est le directeur de l'orchestre municipal, Friedrich Nicolaus Brauns, qui mit le ..."

Both the Johannes-Passion (1702) and Markus-Passion (1705) were for a long time attributed to Reinhard Keiser. The Markus-Passion is also attributed to Gottfried Keiser, Reinhard's father. Bach performed the Markus-Passion in Weimar and in Leipzig.Christoph Wolff Johann Sebastian Bach El Musico Sabio 2003, 2008 Page 317 "De ahí que prefiriese modificar su Pasión según san Juan para el año 1725, y seleccionar la Pasión según san Marcos de Friedrich Nicolaus Brauns para 1726. Bach había interpretado la obra de Brauns en Weimar, y en esta oportunidad la ... Several pasticcio versions of the Markus-Passion survive, but Bach's copy preserved the original. The earliest attribution to Keiser can be found in Bach's copy.

WorksJohannes-Passion 1702, formerly attributed to Reinhard Keiser.Markus-Passion'' composed 1705, first performed at the Cathedral in 1707. Formerly attributed to Reinhard Keiser, then to Bruhns, this passion is also attributed to Gottfried Keiser, Reinhard's father.
11 solo cantatas

References

External links
 The Bruhns family tree on the German Wikipedia

German Baroque composers
1637 births
1718 deaths
18th-century classical composers
German classical composers
German male classical composers
18th-century German composers
18th-century German male musicians